Jerko "Ješa" Denegri is a Serbian art historian and art critic who lives in Belgrade, Serbia.

Biography
He was born on September 5, 1936, in Split, Kingdom of Yugoslavia, now Croatia. Graduated on University of Belgrade Faculty of Philosophy at the Department of Art History where he defended his PhD thesis. He was a curator at the Museum of Contemporary Art (Belgrade) from 1965 to 1991 and a professor on Belgrade Faculty of Philosophy from 1991 to 2007 at the Department of Art History. He wrote more than 3000 theoretical texts, essays, critics about modern, contemporary and actual art in daily, weekly and monthly periodicals as such as in specialized journals. Author of many Yugoslav and Serbian visual art exhibitions and a monograph and catalog preface of their most important protagonists. He was a commissioner on the Yugoslav Biennial of Young Artists in Paris Centre Pompidou, and Venice Biennial. He initiated and was the editor and chief editor of several professional journals: The Art (Belgrade), Architecture-Urbanism (Belgrade), Moment (Gornji Milanovac - Belgrade), Projeka(r)t (Novi Sad) etc.

He is the member of International Association of Art Critics (AICA).

References

External links
 Biography at Monoskop.org
 Biography at Belgrade University Library

Serbian art historians
Serbian art critics
1936 births
Writers from Split, Croatia
Academic staff of the University of Belgrade
Living people
University of Belgrade Faculty of Philosophy alumni
Serbs of Croatia